Naujan Lake is a freshwater lake in the Philippines located in the northeastern corner of the province of Oriental Mindoro on Mindoro Island. The lake is the fifth largest in the country and the main geographical feature of the Naujan Lake National Park. The entire area is a Ramsar Wetland Site since 1999.

Geography

The lake is bounded by the towns of Naujan to the north and northeast, Victoria to the west, Socorro to the south and southeast, and Pola to the east. The lake is also bounded by the Naujan Mountains to the north and east of the lake.

Mount Naujan, elevation  and one of the inactive volcanoes of the country, is situated northeast of the geographic center of the lake. Several thermal springs and solfataras are reported to exist on the eastern border of the Naujan Lake.

Hydrology
The lake is fed by the Macatoc, Borbocolon, Malayas, Malabo, Maambog, Malbog and Cusay Creek from the east; by Bambang, Tigbao and Tagbakin Creek from the west; and by Subaan and Singulan River from the south. The lake has only one outlet, the Butas River, which flow north then heads east after the Lumangbayan River joins the river and empties to Tablas Strait at Barangay Lumang-bayan, Naujan.

National Park

The lake and adjoining areas totaling  was declared a national park on March 27, 1956 through Proclamation No. 282 by President Ramon Magsaysay.

NLNP covers twenty-four (24) barangays under the jurisdiction of four municipalities, namely:  
Naujan – Brgys. Bayani, Laguna, Montelago and Dao
Pola – Brgys. Matula-tula, Tagbakin and Casiligan
Socorro – Brgys. Lapog, Mabuhay I, Mabuhay II, Batongdalig, Pasi I, Pasi II, Happy Valley and Subaan
Victoria – Brgys. Merit, Daungan, Bambanin, Pakyas, Leido, Malabo, Urdaneta, San Narciso and Canaan

The Park has existing facilities for tourism and recreational activities which include picnic tables and a house/quarters located at Minglit Point. A guard house is located at Brgy. Malabo in Victoria town and a watch tower is located at CENRO in Pasi, Socorro.   The park caters for recreational activities such as boating, picnics, bird watching, educational tour and scientific research.  Also, the park is considered the widest breeding place of marsh birds and has a quarterly Biodiversity Monitoring System (BMS) which includes bird counting.

See also
List of national parks of the Philippines
List of protected areas of the Philippines

References

External links
Naujan Lake National Park – DENR website
Ramsar information sheet

Lakes of the Philippines
National parks of the Philippines
Ramsar sites in the Philippines
Protected areas established in 1956
Landforms of Oriental Mindoro
Tourist attractions in Oriental Mindoro